Phoenix tree may refer to:

Phoenix (plant), a genus of palm species
Paulownia, a genus of Asian deciduous trees, known as "phoenix tree" in some Asian cultures
Firmiana simplex, or Chinese parasol tree, sometimes known as "phoenix tree" 
Delonix regia, sometimes known as "golden phoenix tree"

See also
The Phoenix Tree, 2007 EP by Japanese post-rock band Mono
The Phoenix Tree (novel), 1984 novel by Australian author Jon Cleary
The Phoenix Tree and Other Stories, 1990 short story collection by Satoko Kizaki